Luis-Manuel Flores (born 1 February 1985) is a Mexican professional tennis player. He reached a career high ranking of 423 in September 2008. He began playing in the Mexico Davis Cup team in 2003. He is coached by José Higueras.

Davis Cup

Notes

External links

People from Xalapa
Mexican male tennis players
1985 births
Living people
Sportspeople from Veracruz
21st-century Mexican people